The 2001–02 Liga Bet season saw Hapoel Tuba, Maccabi Tzur Shalom, Maccabi HaShikma Ramat Hen and Maccabi Be'er Sheva win their regional divisions and promoted to Liga Alef.

At the bottom, Hapoel Ramot Menashe Megiddo (from North A division), Hapoel Baqa al-Gharbiyye, Maccabi Baqa al-Gharbiyye, Hapoel Fureidis (from North B division), Beitar Holon, Hapoel Kafr Qasim, Maccabi Qalansawe, Beitar Ariel, Beitar Nes Tubruk (from South A division), Moadon Tzeirei Rahat, Maccabi Neve Alon Lod and Hapoel Aliyah Kfar Saba (from South B division) were all automatically relegated to Liga Gimel.

North A Division

North B Division

South A Division

South B Division

References
Liga Bet North, 01-02 One 
Liga Bet North B, 01-02 One 
Liga Bet South A, 01-02 One 
Liga Bet South B, 01-02 One 

Liga Bet seasons
5
Israel